Pardes is a Pakistani television drama series originally aired on Hum Sitaray starting from 28 October 2015 to 6 January 2016. It is written by K Rahman and directed by Sabir Waheed. The series features Sarwat Gillani, Faisal Rehman, Taifoor Khan, Juggan Kazim, Erum Akhtar and Sehar Afzal in leading roles. Besides Pakistan, the series is also set in Phuket, Thailand.

Plot 

Pardes revolves around a household from Lahore where two brothers live together happily with their families. On the wedding days of their children, the elder brother's son, Kabeer refuses to marry the daughter of younger brother, Mubashir. He leaves the house and goes to abroad to his friend, Sonia whom he knows and becomes a friend on internet. Sonia lives in Phuket with her mother and works in the house of a rich businessman, Makdoom Shah Zaman. She takes care of the wife of Zaman, Geati who has some problems likely bipolar disorder.

Cast 
 Sarwat Gillani as Geati
 Faisal Rehman as Makhdoom Shah Zaman
 Juggan Kazim as Sanam
 Taifoor Khan as Kabeer
 Sehar Afzal as Sonia
 Erum Akhtar as Shaheen
 Imran Ashraf as Jawad
 Sohail Sameer as Zaheer
 Irfan Khoosat as Kabeer and Zaheer's father
 Mohsin Gillani as Mubashir
 Munazzah Arif as Fariha
 Seemi Raheel as Sonia's mother
 Kinza Malik as Arslan's mother
 Tehreem Afzal as Sobia

References 

Pakistani television series
Hum TV
2015 Pakistani television series debuts
Pakistani drama television series
2010s Pakistani television series debuts
2010s Pakistani television series
2010s Pakistani television series endings